"Do You Feel Like I Feel?" is a song by American singer Belinda Carlisle, released as the second single from her fourth studio album, Live Your Life Be Free (1991). It became Carlisle's last single to chart on the US Billboard Hot 100, peaking at number 73.

Music video
The music video was inspired by the cult film Attack of the 50 Foot Woman, and was directed by Nick Egan.

Track listings
7-inch, cassette, and mini-CD single
 "Do You Feel Like I Feel?"
 "World of Love"

CD single, Australian cassette single
 "Do You Feel Like I Feel?"
 "World of Love"
 "Do You Feel Like I Feel?" (dance mix) 
 "Live Your Life Be Free" (dance instrumental mix)

Charts

References

 Belinda Carlisle 1991 singles at BelindaVault

1991 singles
1991 songs
Belinda Carlisle songs
MCA Records singles
Song recordings produced by Rick Nowels
Songs written by Ellen Shipley
Songs written by Rick Nowels
Virgin Records singles